The English Teacher is a 2013 American romantic comedy-drama film directed by Craig Zisk. The film stars Julianne Moore, Michael Angarano, Greg Kinnear, Lily Collins, and Nathan Lane, and was written by Dan and Stacy Chariton. It received mixed reviews.

Plot

Linda Sinclair (Julianne Moore) is a high school English teacher in the small town of Kingston, Pennsylvania. She is passionate about her subject and popular with her students, but lives alone in simple circumstances. Cursed with a hopeless romantic soul, she lives in a world of men unable to match her impossible standards.

When her former star pupil Jason Sherwood (Michael Angarano) returns after graduating from NYU's playwriting program, crushed and insecure after failing to succeed, Linda and drama teacher Carl Kapinas (Nathan Lane) convince him to produce his play at the school. Jason's father, Dr. Tom Sherwood (Greg Kinnear), pressures him to attend law school instead, which he finally relents to with no other prospects in sight.

Complications arise after Linda and Jason, in a moment of impulsive creative madness, have a sexual encounter on her classroom desk. Various jealousies and rumors ensue, affecting her and everyone around her including the production of Jason's play. When the school heads are confronted with proof of her indiscretion with a former student, Linda is fired on the spot.

Embarrassed, Linda hurries off, gets into a minor car collision, and ends up at a hospital where she's attended to by Dr. Sherwood. She is moved by his gracious manner after having been mean to him on a previous occasion. She guiltily admits to having had sex with his son.

With news of advance-ticket sales of beyond $18,000 for Jason's play, the principal backtracks, persuading Linda to return and resume directing duties so the play may go on. However, the school heads require a new ending for the play as the current one is considered overly violent and fear parents will be outraged by its dark themes of murder and suicide. Jason feels betrayed and refuses to rewrite the play's ending, so Linda is forced to come up with a suitable replacement herself. She manages to write an improved ending which appeases the school and Jason (when he sees the play is a success).

Jason moves on to write further plays as Linda eases back into teaching and regaining her reputation. Sometime later, Linda runs into Jason's father at her favorite bookshop. Catching up over coffee, both realize they'd totally misread each other previously. Grateful for all she has done for his son, and pleasantly surprised they have much more in common than previously thought, Tom invites Linda on a further proper date, and she, somewhat hesitantly, accepts.

Cast
 Julianne Moore as Linda Sinclair 
 Michael Angarano as Jason Sherwood
 Greg Kinnear as Dr. Tom Sherwood
 Lily Collins as Halle Anderson
 Nathan Lane as Carl Kapinas
 Jessica Hecht as Principal Trudie Slocum
 Norbert Leo Butz as Vice-Principal Phil Pelaski
 Nikki Blonsky as Sheila Nussbaum
 Erin Wilhelmi as Joni Gerber
 Alan Aisenberg as Benjamin Meyer
 Charlie Saxton as Will
 Sophie Curtis as Fallon Hughes
 Fiona Shaw (voice only) as Narrator

Production
The English Teacher was first announced in September 2011. It was Zisk's feature film directorial debut, following his work on several television shows, including Weeds, The Big C, Scrubs, and The United States of Tara.

Release
The film had its world premiere at the Tribeca Film Festival on April 26, 2013, followed by a US theatrical release on May 17. It was released in 7 theaters, and earned $104,810 domestically at the box office, and $215,203 in other territories, for a worldwide gross of $320,013. The film also had a video on demand release.

Reception
On Rotten Tomatoes the film has an approval rating of 41% based on reviews from 37 critics, with an average rating of 5.39/10. On Metacritic the film has a score of 42 out of 100, based on reviews from 13 critics, indicating "mixed or average reviews".

References

External links
 
 Online English Teacher
 

2013 films
2013 romantic comedy-drama films
American romantic comedy-drama films
Films about educators
Films scored by Rob Simonsen
Films set in Pennsylvania
Films shot in New York (state)
2013 directorial debut films
2013 comedy films
2013 drama films
2010s English-language films
2010s American films